EAMI is a 2022 Paraguayan drama film directed by Paz Encina. It was screened in the 51st International Film Festival Rotterdam and won the Tiger Award.

Cast
 Anel Picanerai
 Curia Chiquejno Etacoro
 Ducubaide Chiquenoi
 Basui Picanerai Etacore
 Lucas Etacori
 Guesa Picanerai
 Lazaro Dosapei Cutamijo

Production
The film is an international co-production between Paraguay, Germany, Argentina, Netherlands, France and United States.

Awards and nominations

See also
 List of submissions to the 95th Academy Awards for Best International Feature Film
 List of Paraguayan submissions for the Academy Award for Best International Feature Film

References

External links

2022 drama films
2022 films
American drama films
Argentine drama films
French drama films
Films shot in Paraguay
French films based on actual events
German drama films
Guaraní-language films
Indigenous cinema in Latin America
Paraguayan drama films
2020s American films
2020s French films
 Ayoreo-language films